Andrew Craighan (born 18 July 1970) is one of My Dying Bride's founding guitarists.  Craighan is one of two original My Dying Bride members still in the lineup, alongside Aaron Stainthorpe. He played the guitar from 1989 to 1990 in the band Abiosis.

Equipment
 Macpherson Guitars, EMG Pickups, Sperzel Tuners, Elixir Strings

References

English heavy metal guitarists
Living people
1970 births
21st-century British guitarists